Ved Prakash Marwah  (15 September 1934 – 5 June 2020) was an Indian police officer, who after retirement,  served as governor of Manipur, Mizoram and Jharkhand. He died at Goa at the age of 87 after a three-week hospitalisation.

Early life

He was born and raised in Peshawar, North-West Frontier Province, British India. The son of Faqirchand Marwah, he immigrated to the Union of India after the Partition of India. He completed his education at St. Stephens College, where he served as President of the Alumni Association. He also completed a diploma in Public Administration from the University of Manchester, UK.

Police service
An officer of the Indian Police Service, Marwah has held assignments during his 36-year career, including Commissioner of Police (1985–88), Delhi; and Director General of the National Security Guard (1988–90). He was awarded India's fourth-highest civil award, the Padma Shri in 1989.

Governor and other administrative positions
He served as Adviser to the Governors of Jammu & Kashmir and Bihar, and as governor of Manipur from 1999 to 2003, governor of Mizoram from 2000 to 2001, and governor of Jharkhand from 2003 to 2004. He was also honorary Professor at the Centre for Policy
Research, and President of the Centre for Policy Studies, New Delhi.

Publications
His publications include "Indian in Turmoil-J&K (2009)", "Left Extremism and Northeast", and "Uncivil Wars: Pathology of Terrorism in India".

Another publication "Counterterrorism in Punjab" was published by Indiana University, while "Autonomy in Jammu and Kashmir" was published by Kreddah, Amsterdam.

Death 
Marwah died on 5 June 2020.

References 

Indian police chiefs
Governors of Jharkhand
Governors of Manipur
Governors of Mizoram
1934 births
2020 deaths
People from Peshawar
Commissioners of Delhi Police
Chiefs of police
Indian Police Service officers
Recipients of the Padma Shri in civil service